Duanne Olivier (born 9 May 1992) is a South African cricketer who plays for the South Africa cricket team and for the Knights cricket team in domestic fixtures. He is a right-arm fast-medium bowler.

In February 2019, Olivier signed a Kolpak deal to play for Yorkshire County Cricket Club in England, which meant he could not play for South Africa during his contract with Yorkshire. After signing his Kolpak deal, Olivier expressed his hopes to one day play for the England cricket team. When the Kolpak deal ended in 2021 due to Brexit, Olivier continued as an overseas player for Yorkshire and was selected in South Africa's Test squad ahead of their series against India.

Domestic and franchise career
Olivier was the leading wicket-taker in the 2016–17 Sunfoil Series, with 52 dismissals. In May 2017, he was named First-class Cricketer of the Season at Cricket South Africa's annual awards. In August 2017, he was named in Jo'burg Giants' squad for the first season of the T20 Global League. However, in October 2017, Cricket South Africa initially postponed the tournament until November 2018, with it being cancelled soon after.

In October 2018, Olivier was named in Jozi Stars' squad for the first edition of the Mzansi Super League T20 tournament. He was the leading wicket-taker for Knights in the 2018–19 CSA 4-Day Franchise Series, with 27 dismissals in six matches.

In March 2019, while playing for Yorkshire against Leeds/Bradford MCCU in the 2019 Marylebone Cricket Club University Matches, Olivier took his 400th first-class wicket.

In September 2019, Olivier was named in the squad for the Jozi Stars team for the 2019 Mzansi Super League tournament. In October 2020, he was drafted by the Jaffna Stallions for the inaugural edition of the Lanka Premier League. In April 2021, he was named in Gauteng's squad, ahead of the 2021–22 cricket season in South Africa.

International career
In January 2017, Olivier was added to South Africa's Test squad ahead of the third Test against Sri Lanka. He replaced Kyle Abbott, who earlier had quit international cricket to sign for the English team Hampshire as a Kolpak player.

Olivier made his Test debut for South Africa against Sri Lanka on 12 January 2017. In December 2018, in the first innings of South Africa's Boxing Day Test at Centurion Park in Centurion, Olivier took his first five-wicket haul in Tests, against Pakistan. He went on to take another five-wicket haul in the second innings of the match. He finished with 24 wickets across the three Tests of the tour and was named the player of the series. After the Test series, he was then added to South Africa's squad for the first two One Day Internationals (ODIs) against Pakistan. He made his ODI debut for South Africa against Pakistan on 19 January 2019.

Personal life
Olivier was born in Pretoria and currently lives in Bloemfontein. He is a big football fan and is an avid supporter of Manchester United.

See also
 List of Kolpak cricketers

References

External links
 

1992 births
Living people
People from Pretoria
South African cricketers
South Africa Test cricketers
South Africa One Day International cricketers
Free State cricketers
Knights cricketers
Derbyshire cricketers
Yorkshire cricketers
Jaffna Kings cricketers
Jozi Stars cricketers
Gauteng cricketers